David Jesús Doblas Portilla (born August 6, 1981 in Santander, Cantabria) is a Spanish professional basketball player who plays for Shiga Lakes of the Japanese B.League. At 2.09 m (6'10¼") and 124 kg (274 lbs.), he plays at the center position, but he can also play as a power forward, if needed.

Professional career
In 2009, Doblas played in the NBA Summer League with the Toronto Raptors's Summer League team.

On 30 September 2016, Doblas penned a contract with Doxa Lefkadas of the Greek Basket League. However, despite the announcement, on 1 October 2016, he played in the first Spanish 2nd Division game with the Basque team Araberri, scoring 8 points and grabbing 7 rebounds, in their 87–76 win against Tau Castelló, before joining the Greek team.

Honors 
Clubs Honors
Spanish 2nd Division Champion: (2005–06 with Bruesa GBC)

References

External links 

 FIBA Profile
 FIBA Europe Profile
 Eurobasket.com Profile
 Draftexpress.com Profile
 ACB Profile 
 Twitter 

1981 births
Living people
Araberri BC players
Bambitious Nara players
Basketball players from Cantabria
CB Granada players
Centers (basketball)
Doxa Lefkadas B.C. players
Estudiantes Concordia basketball players
Gipuzkoa Basket players
Kumamoto Volters players
Levanga Hokkaido players
Liga ACB players
Melilla Baloncesto players
Menorca Bàsquet players
Power forwards (basketball)
Rizing Zephyr Fukuoka players
Spanish men's basketball players
Sportspeople from Santander, Spain